The Calidus B-350 is an Emirati turboprop attack aircraft under development by Calidus.

Design and development 
The existence of the B-350 was first made public during the 2021 Dubai Airshow, where a full-scale mock-up of the aircraft was unveiled.  The aircraft is a two-seat design to be powered by a single Pratt & Whitney Canada PW127 turboprop engine.  Suspended armament will be carried on twelve underwing hardpoints.  The aircraft's retractable tricycle landing gear will be built by the Czech company Charvát AXL.

Due to its large size compared to similar aircraft, comparisons have been drawn between the B-350 and the Douglas A-1 Skyraider.

Specifications (B-350, estimated)

See also

References 

Single-engined turboprop aircraft
Emirati military aircraft
Single-engined tractor aircraft
Low-wing aircraft